Farm to Market Road 109 (FM 109) is a farm to market road in the U.S. state of Texas. The highway begins at Business State Highway 71 (SH 71) just north of Columbus in Colorado County. It winds its way to the northeast across Austin County, passing through the communities of New Ulm and Industry before ending at State Highway 36 (SH 36) in Brenham in Washington County.

Route description
This location is just north of Columbus in Colorado County. At Frelsburg, FM 109 comes to a crossroads at Heinsohn's Country Store, with FM 1291 coming from the west and McElroy Lane coming from the north. At the intersection, FM 109 turns sharply to the east. The highway gradually swings to the east-northeast for  before entering New Ulm in Austin County. FM 109 is also called Ernst Parkway in this area. At New Ulm, the highway crosses the BNSF Railway tracks and intersects with FM 1094 from the east. At this place, the highway intersects with SH 159, which goes east and west. From Industry, FM 109 heads north-northeast for  until crossing FM 2502 near the community of Welcome. From this point, the highway heads to the northeast  until its end. Just inside the southern city limits of Brenham, FM 109 crosses the BNSF Railway tracks and ends at a traffic signal on SH 36.

History
FM 109 was originally designated on August 1, 1944, to go from Industry to New Ulm and from Frelsburg to SH 71 near Columbus. On June 13 and 16, 1945, the two separate sections were linked when a new section between New Ulm and Frelsburg was added. On December 16, 1948, FM 109 was extended from Industry to SH 36 south of Brenham, replacing FM 388, which went from the Colorado County Line to SH 36. The new segment went through the communities of Welcome and Muellersville.

Major intersections

See also

References 

0109
Transportation in Austin County, Texas
Transportation in Colorado County, Texas
Transportation in Washington County, Texas